Satoshi Fukuoka is a Japanese mixed martial artist. He competed in the Middleweight division.

Mixed martial arts record

|-
| Loss
| align=center| 0-2-1
| Mamoru Okochi
| Technical Submission (triangle choke)
| Shooto - Vale Tudo Access 3
| 
| align=center| 1
| align=center| 1:02
| Tokyo, Japan
| 
|-
| Loss
| align=center| 0-1-1
| Kenji Ogusu
| Submission (kneebar)
| Shooto - Shooto
| 
| align=center| 3
| align=center| 2:52
| Tokyo, Japan
| 
|-
| Draw
| align=center| 0-0-1
| Takeshi Miyanaga
| Draw
| Shooto - Shooto
| 
| align=center| 3
| align=center| 3:00
| Tokyo, Japan
|

See also
List of male mixed martial artists

References

External links
 
 Satoshi Fukuoka at mixedmartialarts.com

Japanese male mixed martial artists
Living people
Year of birth missing (living people)